Union stockyards in the United States were centralized urban livestock yards were multiple rail lines delivered animals from ranches and farms for slaughter and meat packing. A stockyard company managed the work of unloading the livestock, which was faster and more efficient than using railway staff. Terminal stockyards received, handled, fed, watered, weighed, held, and forward-shipped commercial livestock. The Chicago Union Stock Yards were the most famous and enduring example of this type of commercial complex. They are considered one of the chief drivers that empowered the animal–industrial complex into its modern form. Stock yards also existed in Canada. Livestock from ranches in Mexico and points south were sometimes driven to American stockyards. 

Circa 1923 there were approximately 70 major stockyards in the United States. Stockyards mostly handled cattle and pigs for beef and pork production, but occasionally served as waystations for other animals. For example, around 1934 a dozen American bison from Colorado headed for Santa Catalina Island were held at the Los Angeles Union Stock Yards before boarding the ferry for their final leg of the trip.

List of major commercial stockyards in the United States 

 Atlanta Union Stock Yards
 Brighton Stock Yards, Boston
 Cincinnati Union Stock Yards
 Chicago Union Stock Yards
 Denver Stock Yards
 Detroit Stock Yards
 El Paso Union Stock Yards
 Fort Worth Stockyards
 Jersey City Stock Yards
 Kansas City Stockyards
 Los Angeles Union Stock Yards
 Memphis Union Stock Yards
 Nashville Union Stock Yards
 New Orleans Stock Yards
 Omaha Union Stock Yards
 Peoria Union Stockyards
 Portland Union Stock Yards
 St. Louis National Stock Yards
 Pittsburgh Union Stock Yards
 Spokane Union Stock Yards
 Wichita Union Stock Yards

See also 
 Animal–industrial complex
 Packers and Stockyards Act

References 

Meat processing in the United States